The Ministry of Economy and Finance of Uruguay is a ministry of the Government of Uruguay that is responsible for administering, improving and strengthening the finance of Uruguay through certain competent bodies. This secretary of state is responsible for accounting for the profits of a country through imports and exports. It is also responsible for requesting and paying loans, and for administering the money that is spent on the different state distributions, for which the National Budget is presented to the Parliament. The current Minister of Economy and Finance is Azucena Arbeleche, who has held the position since March 1, 2020.

Creation 
The Ministry of Economy and Finance (MEF) was created as the Ministry of Finance by Law of March 8, 1830, but on January 7, 1970 through Article 103, Law No. 13,835 changes its name to the Ministry of Economy and Finance by assigning it In addition to the tasks of the previous one, all those who derive or serve as a means to carry out their main role of superior leadership of the national economic and financial policy.

Ministers of Economy and Finance of Uruguay 
List of Ministers of Finance from 1830 to 1943:

List of Ministers of Economy and Finance since 1943:

¹ Ministers  of the Military-Civic government (1973-1985).

References

External links 
  Uruguayan Minister for Economy and Finance (in Spanish only)

Economy
Uruguay
Uruguay
1830 establishments in Uruguay
Economy of Uruguay